The yellow-mantled weaver (Ploceus tricolor) is a species of bird in the family Ploceidae.
It is sparsely distributed across the African tropical rainforest.

References

External links

 Yellow-mantled weaver -  Species text in Weaver Watch.

yellow-mantled weaver
Birds of the African tropical rainforest
yellow-mantled weaver
Taxonomy articles created by Polbot